The foreign policy of Denmark is based on its identity as a sovereign state in Europe, the Arctic and the North Atlantic. As such its primary foreign policy focus is on its relations with other nations as a sovereign state compromising the three constituent countries: Denmark, Greenland and the Faroe Islands. Denmark has long had good relations with other nations.
It has been involved in coordinating Western assistance to the Baltic states (Estonia, Latvia, and Lithuania). The country is a strong supporter of international peacekeeping. Danish forces were heavily engaged in the former Yugoslavia in the UN Protection Force (UNPROFOR), with IFOR, and now SFOR. Denmark also strongly supported American operations in Afghanistan and has contributed both monetarily and materially to the ISAF. These initiatives are a part of the "active foreign policy" of Denmark. Instead of the traditional adaptative foreign policy of The unity of the Realm, Kingdom of Denmark is today pursuing an active foreign policy, where human rights, democracy and other crucial values is to be defended actively. In recent years, Greenland and the Faroe Islands have been guaranteed a say in foreign policy issues, such as fishing, whaling and geopolitical concerns.

Following World War II, Denmark ended its two-hundred-year-long policy of neutrality. Denmark has been a member of NATO since its founding in 1949, and membership in NATO remains highly popular. There were several serious confrontations between the U.S. and Denmark on security policy in the so-called "footnote era" (1982–88), when an alternative parliamentary majority forced the government to adopt specific national positions on nuclear and arms control issues. The alternative majority in these issues was because the Social liberal Party (Radikale Venstre) supported the governing majority in economic policy issues, but was against certain NATO policies and voted with the left in these issues. The conservative led Centre-right government accepted this variety of "minority parliamentarism", that is, without making it a question of the government's parliamentary survival.
With the end of the Cold War, Denmark has been supportive of U.S. policy objectives in the Alliance.

Danes have a reputation as "reluctant" Europeans. When they rejected ratification of the Maastricht Treaty on 2 June 1992, they put the EC's plans for the European Union on hold. In December 1992, the rest of the EC agreed to exempt Denmark from certain aspects of the European Union, including a common security and defense policy, a common currency, EU citizenship, and certain aspects of legal cooperation. The Amsterdam Treaty was approved in the referendum of 28 May 1998. In the autumn of 2000, Danish citizens rejected membership of the Euro currency group in a referendum. The Lisbon treaty was ratified by the Danish parliament alone. It was not considered a surrendering of national sovereignty, which would have implied the holding of a referendum according to article 20 of the constitution.

History

In 1807 Denmark was neutral but Britain bombarded Copenhagen and seized the Danish Navy, Denmark became an ally of Napoleon.  After Napoleon was profoundly defeated in Russia in 1812, the Allies repeatedly offered King Frederick VI a proposal to change sides and break with Napoleon. The king refused. Therefore, at the peace of Kiel in 1814, Denmark was forced to cede Norway to Sweden. Denmark thus became one of the chief losers of the Napoleonic Wars.   Danish historiography portrayed King Frederick VI as stubborn and incompetent, and motivated by a blind loyalty to Napoleon. A more recent Danish historiographical approach emphasizes the Danish state was multi-territorial, and included the semi – separate Kingdom of Norway. It was dependent for food on grain imports controlled by Napoleon, and worried about Swedish ambitions. From the king's perspective, these factors called for an alliance with Napoleon. Furthermore, the king expected the war would end in a negotiated international conference, with Napoleon playing a powerful role that included saving Norway for Denmark.

1900–1945

The Danish government responded to the First World War by declaring neutrality 1914–1918. It maintained that status until 1945 and accordingly adjusted trade; humanitarianism; diplomacy; and attitudes. The war thus reshaped economic relations and shifting domestic power balances.

1990– 
Since the end of the Cold War, Denmark has become more supportive of U.S. foreign policy. Denmark supported the U.S. invasion of Iraq in 2003 and contributed assets to the invasion. Denmark also participated in the Afghanistan War. Denmark increased its participation in military and peacekeeping operations compared to the pre-Cold War period. Whereas Denmark only participated in 13 military operations from 1945 to 1989, Denmark participated in 76 military operations between 1990 and 2018.

International disputes
North Pole. Denmark is trying to prove that the North Pole is geographically connected to Greenland. If such proof is established, the Kingdom will claim the North Pole.

Settled international disputes
Hans Island. An island located between Greenland and Canadian Arctic islands. Unresolved boundary disputed between Canada and Denmark (The state of Denmark is responsible for Greenland's foreign relations). This dispute flared up again in July 2005 following the visit of a Canadian minister to the disputed island. On 14 June 2022 both countries agreed to split the disputed island in half. In accordance with the Greenland home rule treaty, Denmark handles certain foreign affairs, such as border disputes, on behalf of the entire Danish Realm.

Europe

Americas

Middle East

Asia

Africa

Oceania

See also

 Politics of Denmark
 History of Denmark
Denmark–Soviet Union relations
Politics of Denmark
Politics of the Faroe Islands
Politics of Greenland
Denmark and the European Union
Danish European Union opt-outs referendum
Scandinavian defense union
List of diplomatic missions of Denmark
List of diplomatic missions in Denmark
Visa requirements for Danish citizens
Foreign relations of Greenland

References

Notes

Further reading
 Andreasen, Uffe. "Reflections on public diplomacy after the Danish cartoon crises: From crisis management to normal public diplomacy work." Hague Journal of Diplomacy 3.2 (2008): 201–207.
 Due-Nielsen, Carsten, and Nikolaj Petersen. "Denmark's foreign policy since 1967: An introduction." in Adaptation and Activism (Copenhagen: DJØF Publishing, 1995): 11–54.
 Frederichsen, Kim. Soviet Cultural Diplomacy Towards Denmark During the Cold War, 1945–1991 (PhD. Diss. University of Copenhagen, Faculty of Humanities, Department of Cross-Cultural and Regional Studies, 2017).
 Henriksen, Anders, and Jon Rahbek-Clemmensen. "The Greenland card: Prospects for and barriers to Danish Arctic diplomacy in Washington." Danish foreign policy yearbook 1 (2017): 75–98.
 Jakobsen, Peter Viggo, Jens Ringsmose, and Håkon Lunde Saxi. "Prestige-seeking small states: Danish and Norwegian military contributions to US-led operations." European journal of international security 3.2 (2018): 256-277.
 Jakobsen, Peter Viggo, and Jens Ringsmose. "Size and reputation—why the USA has valued its ‘special relationships’ with Denmark and the UK differently since 9/11." Journal of Transatlantic Studies 13.2 (2015): 135-153. 
 Kaarbo, Juliet, and Cristian Cantir. "Role conflict in recent wars: Danish and Dutch debates over Iraq and Afghanistan." Cooperation and Conflict 48.4 (2013): 465-483.
 Kronvall. Olof. "US–Scandinavian Relations Since 1940." in the Oxford Research Encyclopedia of Politics. (Oxford University Press, 2020).
 Lidegaard, Bo.  Defiant Diplomacy: Henrik Kauffmann, Denmark, and the United States in World War II and the Cold War, 1939–1958. Peter Lang, 2003.  . 
 Petersen, Nikolaj. "Denmark and NATO 1948-1987." (1987). 
 
 Rahbek-Clemmensen, Jon. ""An Arctic Great Power"? Recent Developments in Danish Arctic Policy." Arctic Yearbook 5 (2016): 387–399.

 Wivel, Anders, and Matthew Crandall. "Punching above their weight, but why? Explaining Denmark and Estonia in the transatlantic relationship." Journal of transatlantic studies 17.3 (2019): 392-419.

Pre-1940

 Feldbæk, Ole. "Eighteenth‐century Danish neutrality: Its diplomacy, economics and law." Scandinavian Journal of History 8.1–4 (1983): 3–21.
 Feldbæk, Ole. "Denmark and the Treaty of Kiel 1814." Scandinavian Journal of History 15.3–4 (1990): 259–268.
 Feldbæk, Ole. "Denmark in the Napoleonic Wars: A Foreign Policy Survey." Scandinavian Journal of History 26.2 (2001): 89–101 
 Feldbæk, Ole. "Denmark and the Baltic 1720–1864." In Quest of Trade and Security. the Baltic in Power Politics 1500–1990. Vol 1. 1500–1890 (Probus Förlag, 1995) pp. 257–95.
 Fogdall, Soren Jacob Marius Peterson. Danish-American Diplomacy, 1776–1920 (1922) .

 Gram-Skjoldager, Karen. "Denmark during the First World War: Neutral policy, economy and culture." Journal of Modern European History 17.2 (2019): 234–250.
 Jónsson, Már. "Denmark-Norway as a potential world power in the early seventeenth century." Itinerario 33.2 (2009): 17–27.

 Murdoch, Steve. Britain, Denmark-Norway and the House of Stuart, 1603–1660: A Diplomatic and Military Analysis (Tuckwell Press, 2000).
 Naum, Magdalena, and Jonas M. Nordin. "Introduction: Situating Scandinavian Colonialism." in Scandinavian Colonialism and the Rise of Modernity (Springer, 2013) pp. 3–16.

External link